Charles de Brouckère (6 October 1757 – 29 April 1850) was a Belgian, Flemish politician who was a lawyer, high official and statesman during the Austrian rule, under the United Kingdom of the Netherlands and later in the Kingdom of Belgium. He was knighted in 1817 and became a nobleman.

Personal life 
Charles de Brouckère married with Charlotte-Marie-Anne-Colette de Stoop (1767–1846) in Bruges in 1793.

They had five children:
 Charles de Brouckère (1796–1860), later Mayor of Brussels
 Marie-Pauline de Brouckère (1797–1844)
 Pauline de Brouckère (1798–1854)
 Henri de Brouckère (1801–1891), later Prime Minister of Belgium
 Édouard de Brouckère (1802–1836)

Political career 
In his life, he achieved a number of political goals under different rulers.

Ancien Regime 
Charles de Brouckère got his decree in law in Leuven in 1782, and he became a lawyer in the Flemish Council a year later.

In 1789, he became schepen of the Brugse Vrije and in 1796, he became chairman of the district bank in Bruges.

French rule
 In 1800, he became a counsellor in the Court of Appeal in Brussels.
 In 1807, he returned to Bruges as chairman of the Criminal Court for the Leiedepartment.
 In 1811, he became chamber president in the imperial court in Brussels.
 In 1813, he was elected member of the imperial executive body for the district of Bruges.
 In February 1814, he was appointed by the Allied as Commissioner General on Home Affairs, taking responsibility for the police force within the temporary government.

United Kingdom of the Netherlands 
 On 1 May 1815, he was appointed as royal commissioner for the organisation of the provinces of Namur and Henegouwen.
 On 16 September 1815, he was appointed as Governor of Limburg.
 In 1821, he was appointed as State Councillor of Extraordinary Service.
 In 1828, he became a member of the First Room of Representatives of the United Kingdom of the Netherlands.

Kingdom of Belgium 
 In 1836, he became member of the Noble Brotherhood of the Holy Blood.
 In 1841, he started working as a lawyer in Bruges again, although he didn't have many cases to run considering his age at the time.

Legacy 
He died as a nobleman, aged 92, having had a great political career, but he was quickly forgotten. He is often confused with his son, who bears the same name and became Mayor of Brussels. In 1908, the last of his descendants died childless, meaning his family tree stopped completely.

References

1757 births
1850 deaths
People from Torhout
Belgian knights
19th-century Belgian politicians
19th-century Belgian lawyers
Lawyers of the Austrian Netherlands